The 2022 cycling season for  is the team's third season as a UCI WorldTeam and its eighth season overall. Ahead of the season, the team announced that Canadian tech company Premier Tech would join as a co-title sponsor. They use Factor bicycles, Shimano drivetrain, Black Inc wheels and Inga clothing.

Roster 

Riders who joined the team for the 2022 season

Riders who left the team during or after the 2021 season

Season victories

National, Continental, and World Champions

Notes

References

External links 

 

Israel–Premier Tech
2022
Israel–Premier Tech